Tong is a village on the Isle of Lewis, Scotland,  northeast of the main town of Stornoway on the B895 road to Back and Tolsta. The population of the village is 527 (2001 census). Fishing forms part of the local economy.

History
Between 1919 and 1921, Tong, along with nearby Coll and Gress, was the scene of several land raids. (See the Coll, Lewis article for more).

Facilities
The village has a community centre with a football pitch and a primary school. Its religious establishments include a Free Church of Scotland mission house and a Scottish Episcopal Church meeting house. On 6 August 2014 The Tong Shop (Bùth Thunga) opened in the former Episcopal Church building.  The shop is open from Monday to Saturday and it sells a range of essentials such as milk and bread, as well as local produce such as vegetables and Stornoway black pudding.

Culture and sport 
Every July the Lewis Highland Games and Western Isles Strongest man are held at the community centre with heavy events such as tossing the caber, Highland dancing, bagpipe competitions and other attractions taking place on the football pitch.  The Lewis Highland Games have been held at Tong since 1977 and is the second oldest Games on the isle of Lewis. The local football club is Tong FC.

Notable people
 Sìne NicFhionnlaigh, who composed the song "Fear a' bhàta", lived in Tong in the 1800s
 Mary Anne MacLeod (1912–2000), mother of former U.S. President Donald Trump, was born in Tong
 Alasdair White, fiddler with the Battlefield Band, was born in Tong

Gallery

References

External links 

Tong Primary School
Visitor's guide for the Isle of Lewis
Website of the Western Isles Council with links to other resources
Disabled access to Lewis for residents and visitors

Villages in the Isle of Lewis